David Lee Grayson (June 6, 1939 – July 29, 2017) was an American football cornerback in the American Football League (AFL) and the National Football League (NFL) for the Dallas Texans/Kansas City Chiefs and Oakland Raiders. He played college football at the University of Oregon.

Early years
Grayson attended San Diego High School, playing running back and defensive back. As a sophomore, he helped his team achieve an 11-0-1 record, while outscoring opponents 382-65 and being awarded the mythical National championship by the National Sports News Service. After the season he transferred to Lincoln High School.

After graduating from high school he went on to play at San Diego City College. Besides football, in track he was a part of the 4 × 200 metres relay team that set a national junior college record.

As a junior, he transferred to the University of Oregon, where he played offensive and defensive halfback.

In 1982, he was inducted into the Oregon Sports Hall of Fame. In 2010, he was inducted into the Breitbard Hall of Fame.

Professional career
In 1961, he was signed as an undrafted free agent by the Dallas Cowboys, but because head coach Tom Landry felt he lacked size for the physical play that was needed in NFL at the time, Chief talent scout Gil Brandt called the AFL's Dallas Texans head coach Hank Stram and suggested he give Grayson a look.

Grayson made the team and played four years with the Dallas Texans/Kansas City Chiefs. In 1961, he set the franchise and AFL record for the longest interception return with a 99-yarder against the New York Titans. In 1961, he also led the league in kickoff returns. In 1962 and 1963, he finished second in the league in kickoff returns. In 1965, he was traded to the Oakland Raiders in exchange for cornerback Fred Williamson.

Grayson held the AFL record for longest interception return for a touchdown, 99 yards, against the New York Titans in 1961. He had an interception off George Blanda in the Texans' 1962 double-overtime championship game victory over the defending AFL champion Houston Oilers. Grayson was an AFL All-Star six times, with the Texans/Chiefs in 1962, 1963 and 1964, and with the Raiders in 1965, 1966 and 1969.

In 1967, he was moved from right cornerback to safety. He made a 48-yard return with the opening kickoff against the Oilers in the 1967 AFL Championship Game, helping his team win the game and reach Super Bowl II. In 1968, he led the AFL with 10 interceptions. His 29 interceptions rank seventh all-time in Raiders history.

Grayson is the all-time AFL leader in interceptions with 47, for a 20-yard return average and 5 touchdowns, and he averaged 25.4 yards on 110 kickoff returns. He is a member of the AFL All-Time Team.

In 2017, the Professional Football Researchers Association named Grayson to the PFRA Hall of Very Good Class of 2017.

Personal
After football he opened different businesses, which included one of the biggest nightclubs in Southeast San Diego during the seventies. He also was involved with organizations like the Boys Club, YMCA and the Committee for Community Involvement of Black Athletes.

Grayson died on July 29, 2017. His son, David Lee Grayson, Jr. played linebacker in the NFL from 1987–1990 with the Cleveland Browns and in 1991 with the San Diego Chargers.

References

1939 births
2017 deaths
Players of American football from San Diego
African-American players of American football
American football cornerbacks
San Diego City Knights football players
Oregon Ducks football players
Dallas Texans (AFL) players
Kansas City Chiefs players
Oakland Raiders players
American Football League All-Star players
American Football League All-Time Team
American Football League players
20th-century African-American sportspeople
21st-century African-American people
San Diego High School alumni